Teton Sioux may refer to:

Lakota people, a Native American tribe
Lakota language, a Siouan languages spoken by the Lakota people of the Sioux tribes